= Combitech =

Combitech can refer to following companies:

- Combitech AB
- Combitech Traffic Systems AB
